The Captain Kidd is a pub in Wapping, East London that is named after the seventeenth century pirate William Kidd, who was executed at the nearby Execution Dock. The pub is a Grade II listed building, and was historically used as a coffee warehouse.

History
The Captain Kidd pub is situated at 108 Wapping High Street, next door to the Marine Police Force headquarters. The building originates in the 19th century as a three-storey brick house, and was remodelled in the Edwardian era. To the rear of the building, there is a former workshop that goes out to a wharf. The building, along with 110 Wapping High Street, are now Grade II listed.

In the 1980s, the building became a pub, having previously been a coffee warehouse. It was named after the seventeenth century pirate William Kidd, who was executed at the nearby Execution Dock in 1701. The pub has a nautical theme and retells the story of Captain Kidd and his execution; the layout of the pub is designed to be similar to a ship's hulk. It is a Sam Smith's pub, and is situated on Wapping High Street. The entrance has a large archway, and the pub has three floors, and has a terrace overlooking the River Thames.

References

Pubs in the London Borough of Tower Hamlets
Restaurants in London
History of the London Borough of Tower Hamlets
Buildings and structures on the River Thames
Wapping
Cultural depictions of William Kidd
Grade II listed buildings in the London Borough of Tower Hamlets
Grade II listed pubs in London